Steven Edward "Steve" Salmons (born July 3, 1958, in Saint Joseph, Missouri) is a former American volleyball player.

He won an Olympic gold medal at the 1984 Summer Olympics.

Under the leadership of Kiraly, Partie and Salmons, the U.S. Team completed its only Triple Crown, adding a 1986 World Championship title to its 1985 World Cup crown and '84 Olympic gold medal.

Steve Salmons was a 4-year starter on the UCLA volleyball team (1977-‘79, ‘81) as a middle blocker. He was named the 1979 NCAA Player of the Year, leading the Bruins to the National Championship with a 31-0 record - the first undefeated team in NCAA history. In 1979, Salmons suffered a severe back injury, while representing the United States at the Pan Am games, yet was able to return to play for the Bruins at the end of the 1981 season, helping spark a five-game victory over the Tim Hovland and Steve Timmons led USC Trojans to earn another NCAA title. He was named to the NCAA All-Tournament team (his third time '78,'79,'81) along with MVP Karch Kiraly and Steve Gulnac. In addition to earning the 1979 NCAA Player of the Year, Salmons was named All-American in 1978 and 1979. He was a US National Team Member in 1978-79 and 1981-’86, and played for the gold medal-winning 1984 Olympic team. In 2000, Salmons was inducted into the UCLA Athletics Hall of Fame, and on March 30, 2001, UCLA retired the jersey (No. 29) of former All-American Steve Salmons in pre-match ceremonies. Salmons, inducted into the UCLA Athletics Hall of Fame the previous October, played on two NCAA championship teams.

Steve Salmons was the starting middle blocker on the US national team and helped the US to win its first Olympic Gold Medal in volleyball in 1984. Steve and his team later went on to win USA Volleyball's International Triple Crown, which included the 1985 World Cup Championship over USSR and culminating in 1986 with the gold medal at the World Championships held in Paris, France. Steve was also a 4 year starter at UCLA, won two National NCAA Championships and was named the 1979 NCAA Player of the Year. Steve has been named to the "All Century College Volleyball player's list by Volleyball Magazine" and was inducted in UCLA Athletic "Hall of Fame" in 2000. After retiring from indoor volleyball, Salmons switched to beach volleyball where he starred on the Bud Light 4-Man Professional Beach tour for five years and won over 15 Pro tournaments.

Steve currently resides in San Diego, and for the last 10+ years has owned a Commercial Real Estate Brokerage company Commercial Properties Service. He lives with his wife Cathy and 3 children: William (Reece) Salmons, Taylor Salmons, and Alexis Salmons.

References

1958 births
Living people
Olympic gold medalists for the United States in volleyball
Place of birth missing (living people)
Volleyball players at the 1984 Summer Olympics
American men's volleyball players
Medalists at the 1984 Summer Olympics
Goodwill Games medalists in volleyball
Competitors at the 1986 Goodwill Games
UCLA Bruins men's volleyball players